The Bridges Act 1702 (1 Anne c 12) was an Act of the Parliament of England.

Section 2 ceased to have effect by virtue of section 311 of, and Schedule 23 to, the Highways Act 1959.

The whole Act was repealed by section 312(2) of, and Schedule 25 to, the Highways Act 1959, subject to section 42(1) of that Act.

The repeal effected by section 312(2) of the Highways Act 1959 was extended to the whole of Greater London by section 16(2) of, and paragraph 70 of Schedule 6 to, the London Government Act 1963.

See also
Bridges Act

References
Halsbury's Statutes,

Acts of the Parliament of England
1702 in law
1702 in England
Bridges in England